The Beast of Bray Road, also known as the Bray Road Beast and the Wisconsin Werewolf, is a purported humanoid wolf-like creature allegedly witnessed in or near the rural community of Elkhorn, Walworth County, Wisconsin. It has since become a part of Wisconsin folklore and has been the subject of multiple books, documentaries and a 2005 horror film. 

Named for the farm road in which it was first purportedly sighted, reports of the creature in the 1980s and 1990s prompted a local newspaper, the Walworth County Week, to assign reporter Linda Godfrey to cover the story. Godfrey was initially skeptical, but later became convinced of the sincerity of the witnesses. Her series of articles later became a book titled The Beast of Bray Road: Tailing Wisconsin's Werewolf.

Reports of a similar creature in the neighboring state of Michigan also tell of an alleged wolf-like humanoid, the Michigan Dogman.

Description
It is purported to have been seen moving as both a quadruped and a biped, and some reports describe it more closely to resembling a traditional werewolf or Bigfoot.

History
The creature was allegedly first sighted in 1936. In the 1980s, several alleged witnesses reported the beast had made contact with their vehicles, leaving long scratch marks on doors and trunks of vehicles. One witness stated she hit something while crossing Bray Road. Upon exiting her vehicle to determine what she had hit, supposedly a large wolf-like creature with red eyes chased her back into her car; leaving claw marks in the rear passenger door. Sightings also have been reported during daylight hours, with several witnesses stating they observed an unusually large wolf-like creature running on all fours through corn fields. One stated the creature was in pursuit of a deer.

Animal mutilations have also been reported in the area around Bray Road with animal remains, including deer and livestock, partially eaten with specific organs removed from the animal carcasses. Another witness reported driving down Bray Road late one night and observed an unusually large wolf-like creature eating an animal which had been hit by a car on the side of the road. The creature reportedly ran into the woods as the eyewitness approached it in their vehicle.

Reported sightings continue, most recently in February 2018 and July 2020 when alleged witnesses observed a large, hair covered upright creature in Spring Prairie and Lyons; both in Walworth County.

Investigation
A number of misidentified animal-based theories have been proposed including that the creature is simply a gray wolf or a large dog such as a Great Pyrenees or Newfoundland. While not common in the southern part of the state, wolves are occasionally found in Walworth County and nearby areas.

It is also possible that hoaxes and mass hysteria have caused some falsehoods and sightings of normal creatures to all be artificially lumped under the same label. Others have theorized that the creature may be a bear suffering from mange. Like wolves, American black bears have been sighted in Walworth County.

Popular culture
 The creature was featured as the primary antagonist in the 2005 film The Beast of Bray Road, a horror film produced and distributed by The Asylum.
 The creature was the subject of the 2018 documentary film The Bray Road Beast, produced by Small Town Monsters, an indie production company documenting unusual events throughout America.
 The creature has also been featured in episodes of Lost Tapes (2008), Legend Hunter (2019), Haunted Highway (2012), America's Urban Legends (2016), Hexen Arcane (2020), Slammarang! (2014), In Search of Monsters (2019)  and on Expedition X (2021)

See also
 Michigan Dogman

References

Walworth County, Wisconsin
Wisconsin folklore
American folklore
American legendary creatures